Hristo Zhivkov (born 18 February 1975), also known as Christo Jivkov, is a Bulgarian actor. He played St. John in Mel Gibson's The Passion of the Christ and Giovanni delle Bande Nere in Ermanno Olmi's 2001 The Profession of Arms.

References

External links
 

1975 births
Living people
Male actors from Sofia
Bulgarian male film actors
21st-century Bulgarian male actors
Big Brother (Bulgarian TV series) contestants